FC Arsenal Kharkiv is a football club based in Kharkiv, Ukraine. Arsenal Kharkiv currently plays in the regional competitions of Kharkiv city. In 2005 on the base of the club was formed another club FC Kharkiv. FC Arsenal has a well established infrastructure with series of stadiums and sport schools.

Arsenal Kharkiv withdrew from the Professional Football League of Ukraine after the 2008–09 season, while its youth teams continue to compete in national youth competitions.

Overview
The club was formed on 30 January 1998 at the Kharkiv Aviation Institute sports court. Its initial home stadium was "Spartak" and the first head coach – Valentyn Kryachko. The club's first game at professional level took place on 2 August 1999 in Kremenchuk against the local FC Kremin Kremenchuk, which Arsenal won 1:0. The club's first goal was scored by Viktor Hryhorov.

In 2005 the club was reorganized after a successful season in the 2004–05 Ukrainian First League. After obtaining promotion to the Ukrainian Top League, the club yielded the opportunity to a newly established club FC Kharkiv which was led by the former coach of Arsenal Hennadiy Lytovchenko. Several Arsenal's leading footballers also joined the new club.

In 2005 FC Arsenal Kharkiv started out again from the Ukrainian Second League.

Stadiums

The club has a possession of two stadiums Arsenal-Spartak Stadium (former Spartak) and Arsenal-Bavaria Stadium (former stadium of local rope factory). Also the club has a complex of four fields with a synthetic surface called Arsenal-OPEN. Arsenal-Spartak has capacity of 1500 people, but it's planned to enlarge it to 8000 by 2010; Arsenal-Bavaria has a capacity to accommodate 2300 spectators. In July 2010 Arsenal-Bavaria was given away to FC Helios Kharkiv and was renamed into Helios Arena.

Coaches

Original club
 1998–2001  Valentyn Kryachko
 2001–2002  Ivan Panchyshyn
 2002–2005  Ihor Rakhayev
 2005  Hennadiy Lytovchenko

After reorganization
 2005  Ihor Rakhayev
 2005–2007  Viktor Kamarzayev
 2007  Serhiy Kandaurov
 2007–2008  Adel bin Ahmed Sassi
 2008  Serhiy Kandaurov
 2008–2009  Vladyslav Kysel
 2009  Mykola Trubachov

Notable players
  Anderson Ribeiro, first foreign footballer, first Brazilian footballer in Kharkiv
  Serhiy Rybalka, Ukrainian international player
  Gegham Kadymyan, Armenian international player who started out in Arsenal
  Oleksandr Kucher, Ukrainian international player, participant of the UEFA Euro 2012

League and cup history

Arsenal Kharkiv (1999–2005)

{|class="wikitable"
|-bgcolor="#efefef"
! Season
! Div.
! Pos.
! Pl.
! W
! D
! L
! GS
! GA
! P
!Domestic Cup
!colspan=2|Europe
!Notes
|-
|align=center rowspan=2|1998–99
|align=center rowspan=2|4th
|align=center|1
|align=center|18
|align=center|15
|align=center|1
|align=center|2
|align=center|19
|align=center|6
|align=center|46
|align=center rowspan=2|Amateur Cup
|align=center|
|align=center|
|align=center|
|-
|align=center|4
|align=center|3
|align=center|0
|align=center|1
|align=center|2
|align=center|0
|align=center|5
|align=center|1
|align=center|
|align=center|
|align=center|
|-
|align=center|1999–00
|align=center|3rd "C"
|align=center|4
|align=center|26
|align=center|15
|align=center|4
|align=center|7
|align=center|24
|align=center|13
|align=center|49
|align=center|1/4 Finals 2nd League Cup
|align=center|
|align=center|
|align=center|
|-
|align=center|2000–01
|align=center|3rd "C"
|align=center|4
|align=center|30
|align=center|15
|align=center|7
|align=center|8
|align=center|55
|align=center|27
|align=center|52
|align=center|1/4 Finals 2nd League Cup
|align=center|
|align=center|
|align=center|
|-
|align=center|2001–02
|align=center|3rd "C"
|align=center bgcolor=silver|2
|align=center|34
|align=center|22
|align=center|6
|align=center|6
|align=center|52
|align=center|23
|align=center|72
|align=center|2nd round
|align=center|
|align=center|
|align=center bgcolor=green|Promoted
|-
|align=center|2002–03
|align=center|2nd
|align=center|9
|align=center|34
|align=center|13
|align=center|7
|align=center|14
|align=center|38
|align=center|42
|align=center|46
|align=center|1/8 finals
|align=center|
|align=center|
|align=center|
|-
|align=center|2003–04
|align=center|2nd
|align=center|7
|align=center|34
|align=center|15
|align=center|7
|align=center|12
|align=center|41
|align=center|40
|align=center|52
|align=center|1/32 finals
|align=center|
|align=center|
|align=center|
|-
|align=center|2004–05
|align=center|2nd
|align=center bgcolor=silver|2
|align=center|34
|align=center|23
|align=center|4
|align=center|7
|align=center|47
|align=center|24
|align=center|73
|align=center|1/32 finals
|align=center|
|align=center|
|align=center bgcolor=green|Promoted
|-
|align=center|2005–06
|align=center colspan=13| refer to FC Kharkiv
|}

Arsenal Kharkiv (2005–2009)

{|class="wikitable"
|-bgcolor="#efefef"
! Season
! Div.
! Pos.
! Pl.
! W
! D
! L
! GS
! GA
! P
!Domestic Cup
!colspan=2|Europe
!Notes
|-
|align=center|2005–06
|align=center|3rd "B"
|align=center|10
|align=center|24
|align=center|9
|align=center|3
|align=center|12
|align=center|35
|align=center|44
|align=center|30
|align=center|1/64 finals
|align=center|
|align=center|
|align=center|
|-
|align=center|2006–07
|align=center|3rd "B"
|align=center|9
|align=center|28
|align=center|10
|align=center|4
|align=center|14
|align=center|35
|align=center|42
|align=center|35
|align=center|1/32 finals
|align=center|
|align=center|
|align=center|
|-
|align=center|2007–08
|align=center|3rd "B"
|align=center bgcolor=tan|3
|align=center|34
|align=center|21
|align=center|8
|align=center|5
|align=center|62
|align=center|20
|align=center|71
|align=center|1/32 finals
|align=center|
|align=center|
|align=center|
|-
|align=center|2008–09
|align=center|3rd "B"
|align=center|12
|align=center|34
|align=center|11
|align=center|10
|align=center|13
|align=center|36
|align=center|47
|align=center|40
|align=center|1/64 finals
|align=center|
|align=center|
|align=center|–3 – Withdraw
|-
|align=center|2009–11
|align=center colspan=13| participation in regional competitions of Kharkiv Oblast as Arsenal-Politekhnik
|-
|align=center|2012
|align=center|4th
|align=center|3
|align=center|6
|align=center|2
|align=center|0
|align=center|4
|align=center|5
|align=center|12
|align=center|6
|align=center|
|align=center|
|align=center|
|align=center|
|}

Notes

References

External links
 
 Official site
 Older website
 Club's history, coaches and players at the official website
 Mad Rovers – Arsenal Kharkiv Fans

 
Amateur football clubs in Ukraine
Arsenal Kharkiv
1998 establishments in Ukraine
Association football clubs established in 1998